Present.Perfect. (Mandarin Chinese: 完美現在時 or Wan Mei Xian Zai Shi) is a 2019 documentary film entirely composed of livestream footage recorded from Chinese streaming sites. It was directed and edited by Shengze Zhu. Over the course of ten months, she edited 800 hours of footage into a two-hour montage. The film won the Hivos Tiger Award at the 2019 International Film Festival Rotterdam, where it had its world premiere.

References

External links

Chinese documentary films
2010s Mandarin-language films